Peter Brooks may refer to:

Peter Brooks (cyclist) (born 1970), Australian Paralympic cyclist
Peter Brooks (priest) (born 1955), Welsh Anglican priest
Peter Brooks (writer) (born 1938), professor of comparative literature at Yale University 
Peter Chardon Brooks  (1767–1849), American merchant

See also
Peter Brooke (disambiguation)
Peter Brookes (born 1943), English cartoonist